Runiz-e Sofla (also Romanized as Rūnīz-e Soflá; also known as Deh-e Pā’īn, Deh Pāīn, Rownīz-e Pā’īn, and Rūnīz-e Pā’īn) is a village in Runiz Rural District, Runiz District, Estahban County, Fars Province, Iran. At the 2006 census, its population was 2,067, in 500 families.

References 

Populated places in Estahban County